The Ericson 36 is an American sailboat that was designed by Ron Holland as a racer and first built in 1980.

The Ericson 36 is often confused with a completely different 1975 design, the Ericson 36C.

Production
The design was built by Ericson Yachts in the United States. The company completed 32 examples between 1980 and 1984, but it is now out of production.

Design
The Ericson 36 is a recreational keelboat, built predominantly of fiberglass, with wood trim. It has a masthead sloop rig, a raked stem, a reverse transom, an internally mounted spade-type rudder controlled by a wheel and a fixed fin keel. It displaces  and carries  of ballast.

The design has a notably straight deck sheer line.

Sleeping accommodation for seven is provided and includes a bow "V"-berth, two main cabin double settee berths and an aft pilot berth. The galley is located at the foot of the companionway steps, on the port side and includes a two-burner, alcohol-fired stove. The sink has both pressurized water and foot-pump fresh and salt water. A navigation station is fitted to starboard. The head is just aft of the "V"-berth and on the starboard side. The cabin sole is made from teak and holly, while the main cabin folding table is teak, as are the cockpit seats.

Ventilation is provided by two deck hatches, one over the main cabin and one over the forward cabin.

The mainsail mainsheet traveler is mounted to the bridge deck. There are both inboard and outboard genoa tracks. Two primary cockpit winches are provided along with two secondary, plus four cabin-top winches for the halyards.

An optional staysail may be flown, using an adjustable track.

The design has a PHRF racing average handicap of 108.

Operational history
In a 1994 review Richard Sherwood wrote, "this Ericson is a racing boat, but the construction technique minimizes weight, allowing for a full cruising interior. Ballast constitutes 45 percent of the total displacement, so she should be stiff."

See also
List of sailing boat types

Similar sailboats
Beneteau 361
Bayfield 36
C&C 36-1
C&C 36R
C&C 110
Catalina 36
Columbia 36
Coronado 35
CS 36
Frigate 36
Hinterhoeller F3
Hunter 36
Hunter 36-2
Hunter 36 Legend
Hunter 36 Vision
Invader 36
Islander 36
Nonsuch 36
Portman 36
S2 11.0
Seidelmann 37
Vancouver 36 (Harris)
Watkins 36
Watkins 36C

References

Keelboats
1980s sailboat type designs
Sailing yachts
Sailboat type designs by Ron Holland
Sailboat types built by Ericson Yachts